Gianduja is one of the masks of the Italian commedia dell'arte, typically representing the town of Turin (and Piedmont in general). Gianduja also became the namesake for a Piedmontese chocolate preparation. The mask depicts an honest peasant of Piedmontese country land, with a certain inclination for wine (particularly Brachetto d'Acqui), gastronomy and beautiful girls, while strictly faithful to his lover Giacometta, who is usually represented by a cute girl.

Origins
The character is believed to have originated as Gironi da Crina (in Ligurian) or Geralmo della Scrofa (in Italian), ca. 1630 in Genoa. In the early 19th century, a puppeteer by the name of Giovanni Battista Sales got into trouble with the authorities who did not appreciate his sarcastic humor or the fact that the character had the same first name as a brother of Napoleon, who had invaded the region. Sales fled to Callianetto, a hamlet of Castell'Alfero, east of Turin and just north of Asti, and changed the name of the character to the Piedmontese Gioann dla Doja (later Giandoja and Piedmontenize as Gianduja), which means something like "John of the Jug" (with doja meaning "tankard" or "beer mug", as the character was fond of drinking).

Characteristics
In the commedia dell'arte, Gianduja is a fond drinker and a very lecherous character, and Giacometta, his lover, always becomes jealous of him. Personality-wise, he always has a happy humour.
He is dressed (in the usual version) with a tricorn hat and a brown jacket with red borders.

The character of Gianduja was created as a glove puppet but later became a marionette and then a live character portrayed by an actor. He is now Turin's official "king of the Carnival".

Influences
The character inspired the name of gianduja, a paste of chocolate and hazelnut typical of Turin.

References

Commedia dell'arte characters
Culture in Turin
Fictional Italian people